Stavros Labriakos (born 30 November 1975) is a Greek football player who started and ended his career playing for Aris. Labriakos retired in the summer of 2010.

References
Guardian Football

1975 births
Living people
Greek footballers
Greece under-21 international footballers
Footballers from Thessaloniki
Aris Thessaloniki F.C. players
Apollon Smyrnis F.C. players
Xanthi F.C. players
Super League Greece players
Association football forwards